Yick Yuen Tsuen is a village in Lam Tei, Tuen Mun District, Hong Kong.

Administration
Yick Yuen Tsuen is one of the 36 villages represented within the Tuen Mun Rural Committee. For electoral purposes, Yick Yuen Tsuen is part of the Tuen Mun Rural constituency, which is currently represented by Kenneth Cheung Kam-hung.

References

External links
 Delineation of area of existing village Yick Yuen Tsuen (Tuen Mun) for election of resident representative (2019 to 2022)

Villages in Tuen Mun District, Hong Kong
Lam Tei